Humbe is a town and commune in the municipality of Ombadja, province of Cunene, Angola.

It also used to be the location of a Roman Catholic mission station in southern Angola, located ca. 10 km to the north-east of Xangongo, in the tribal area of the Ombadja tribe of the Ovambos. It was located on a tributary of the Kunene River, flowing into this river from the north.

Humbe was established in ca. 1882, after the Catholics had made a failed attempt to establish themselves near the Finnish mission station of Olukonda in Ondonga, Ovamboland, in 1879, and in then in Omaruru, Hereroland, further south in South West Africa in 1882.

The attempts of the Portuguese to subjugate the Ovambos of Ombadja and Oukwanyama were initially unsuccessful, and 1904 they suffered a massive defeat at the Cunene river. In response, the Portuguese established Forte Roçadas in 1906 in what is now Xangongo, not far from Humbe.

References

Sources

Populated places in Cunene Province
Communes in Cunene Province
Catholic mission stations in Ombadja